Shota Rustaveli (c. 1160 – after c. 1220), mononymously known simply as Rustaveli, was a medieval Georgian poet. He is considered to be the pre-eminent poet of the Georgian Golden Age and one of the greatest contributors to Georgian literature. Rustaveli was the author of The Knight in the Panther's Skin, a Georgian national epic poem.

Biography 
Little, if anything, is known about Rustaveli from contemporary sources. Shota Rustaveli was born in 1166. He started serving Queen Tamar as a Minister of Finance in 1191. His poem itself, namely the prologue, provides a clue to his identity: the poet identifies himself as "a certain Rustveli." "Rustveli" is not a surname, but a territorial epithet that can be interpreted as "of/from/holder of Rustavi". Later Georgian authors from the 15th through 18th centuries are more informative; they are almost unanimous in identifying him as Shota Rustaveli, a name that is preserved on a fresco and a document from the formerly Georgian Monastery of the Holy Cross at Jerusalem. The fresco was described by the Georgian pilgrim Timote Gabashvili in 1757/58 and rediscovered by a team of Georgian scholars in 1960. The same Jerusalem document speaks of Shota as a sponsor of the monastery and a mechurchletukhutsesi ("high treasurer"), echoing a popular legend that Rustaveli was a minister at Queen Tamar’s court and retired to the monastery at an advanced age. Both a folk tradition and the 17th-century royal poet Archil identify Rustaveli as a native of the southern Georgian region of Meskheti, where his home village Rustavi was located (in modern-day Aspindza Municipality, not to be confused with the modern-day city of Rustavi near Tbilisi). He is assumed to have been born between 1160 and 1165. A legend states that Rustaveli was educated at the medieval Georgian academies of Gelati and Ikalto, and then in "Greece" (i.e., the Byzantine Empire). He must have produced his major work no earlier than the 1180s and no later than the first decade of the 13th century, most probably 1205-1207. Shota Rustaveli died between 1245 and 1250.

Rustaveli was well acquainted with Persian "and was therefore able to read and appreciate its poetry without having to resort to faulty translations". Rustaveli may have composed Persian verse as well.

The Knight in the Panther's Skin
The Knight in the Panther's Skin has been translated into many languages. It was first printed in 1712 in the Georgian capital Tbilisi. The manuscripts of The Knight in the Panther's Skin occupy an important place among the works produced in Georgia.

Two folios of this text, dating from the 16th century, are located in the Institute of Manuscripts of Georgia in Tbilisi, and some lines of the poem from the 14th century are also held there. All other copies of the poem date from the 17th century.

Rustaveli mural portrait in Jerusalem

The only known contemporary portrait of Shota Rustaveli was painted on the eastern face of the southwest pillar of the church of the Monastery of the Holy Cross in Jerusalem. It is set at the foot of two much larger images of saints and is accompanied by a Georgian-language inscription.

The portrait was vandalized in June 2004 by an unknown perpetrator, who scratched out Rustaveli's face and part of the accompanying Georgian inscription with his name. Georgia officially complained to Israel after the priceless fresco was defaced. The portrait and inscription have been restored.

Legacy

The highest Georgian state prize in the fields of art and literature is the Shota Rustaveli State Prize. Tbilisi's main thoroughfare is Rustaveli Avenue. In Tbilisi, one can also find the Rustaveli Theatre, the Shota Rustaveli Institute of Georgian Literature of the Georgian National Academy of Sciences, the Shota Rustaveli Tbilisi International Airport and the Rustaveli metro station, among many other landmarks bearing his name.

On September 3, 2001, Israel and Georgia jointly issued postage stamps to honor Shota Rustaveli. Designed by Yitzhak Granot, the Israeli stamp (3.40 NIS) showed the author with Hebrew text in the background.

A street in Tashkent, Uzbekistan, in Kyiv, Lviv and Ternopil, Ukraine and in Gyumri, Armenia are named after Rustaveli, as well as a pathway in Jerusalem, which leads to the Monastery of the Cross.

Georgian composer Tamara Vakhvakhishvili set Rustaveli's poetry to music in her composition Citation for voice and orchestra.

Mihály Zichy 
Mihály Zichy, a 19th-century Hungarian painter, rose to the rank of "national painter" in Georgia as he produced the classic illustrations that have been frequently used in editions of Rustaveli's poetry. A sculpture and a street commemorate Zichy's work in Tbilisi.

References

Sources

External links 
 On the first translation of The Knight in the Panther's skin from Georgian into Russian.
 The Man in the Panther's Skin: full text of M. Wardrop's English translation.
 Shota Rustaveli. The Knight in the Panther's Skin (fragments in English).
 Illustrations by Sergo Kobuladze.
 Shota Rustaveli. Der Ritter im Tigerfell. 
 Shota Rustaveli Institute of Georgian Literature of the Georgian Academy of Sciences.

Literature 
Tite Margwelaschwili. "Der Mann in Pantherfell".- "Georgica", London, 1936 
Zviad Gamsakhurdia. "Tropology of The Knight in the Panther's Skin" (a monograph), Tbilisi, 1991, 352 pp (in Georgian, English summary)
Shota Rustaveli. The Lord of the Panther-Skin, Albany: SUNY Press, 1977, 240 pp, translated by R.H. Stevenson, UNESCO Collection of representative works: Series of translations from the literatures of the Union of Soviet Socialist republics
Shota Rustaveli. The Man in the Panther's Skin, London: The Royal Asiatic Society of Great Britain and Ireland, 1912, translated by Marjory Scott Wardrop, repr. 1966.
Shota Rustaveli. The Knight in Panther Skin, London: The Folio Society, 1977, A free translation in prose by Katharine Vivian.
Beynen, G. Koolemans. "Murder, Foul and Fair, in Shota Rustaveli's The Man in the Panther Skin," in Medieval and Early Modern Murder, Larissa Tracy, ed. (Woodbridge: The Boydell Press, 2018), pp. 350–70.

12th-century poets from Georgia (country)
1160s births
1216 deaths
13th-century poets from Georgia (country)
Male poets from Georgia (country)
Meskhetians